Fußballclub Mauerwerk is an Austrian association football club from the capital city of Vienna.  From September 2014 to June 2018, the club played under the name FC Karabakh Wien. Currently playing in the Regionalliga Ost and plays their home games at the Rudolf-Tonn-Stadion in Schwechat.

History

Founding
Fußballclub Karabakh Wien was founded on August 2, 2014 and officially registered in 2014 in the Wien Football Association (WFV) and has obtained a license to compete in Oberliga A Wien. Oberliga is officially the 3rd player of the Wien Football Association and the 6th League of Austrian Football Association.

Oberliga

2014–15 season
In the 2014–15 season, Karabakh Wien has scored 55 points at the end of the season with 17 wins, 2 draws and 7 defeats from 26 games in Vienna at Oberliga A Wien and finished second behind Wiener SC II in a total of 14 clubs, and with that result did not get access to the 2. Landesliga Wien, so the club decided to buy the SC Kaiserebersdorf-Srbija to secure a place in the top league, moved to Kaiserebersdorf, and played the season 2015–16 in 2. Landesliga Wien. In the same season, the club took part in the Wien Cup and scored 5 consecutive victories. The results obtained for a newly established club have been highly appreciated by local experts.

2. Landesliga

2015–16 season
It started in the 2. Landesliga Wien, which is a major league than the 2014–15 season. The 2. Landesliga Wien is officially the 2nd league of the Wien Football Association, and the 5th league of the Austrian Football Association. Despite the fact that the board of directors played for the first time in this league before the main team, the main goal was simply a championship. Thus, Karabakh Wien won 30 wins in 2. Landesliga Wien, gaining 67 points as a result of 21 wins, 4 draws and 5 defeats and champions the 4 points ahead of the closest spectator in the league where 16 teams fought.

In the same season, the club has achieved great success, as well as parallel to the Wien Cup. In the Wien Cup, where 289 clubs from the Wien Football Association participated, our club rose to the finals and became the champion, winning a 2-0 win over the other finalist SV Gersthof at the Ernst-Happel-Stadion, where the Austria national football team played home matches. Karabakh Wien has been the club for the first time in the history of 2. Landesliga Wien, winning the league and city trophy for the same season. The club has brought the U18 team to the third round of the season. So, in 2015–16, the Karabakh Wien played a historic season by printing 3 championships to Wien's asset.

Landesliga

2016–17 season
In the 2016–17 season Karabakh Wien will start fighting in the highest city league in the city of Vienna. The Wiener Stadtliga is the 1st League of the Vienna Football Association and the 4th League of Austrian Football Association, where the club will be fighting this season. The club, which is seriously preparing for the season, will first be in the match on August 19, 2016. Karabakh Wien, which will hold 30 matches in 16 stadiums throughout the stadium, will be featured by local experts as the main nominees for the championship title.

During the 2016-17 season Karabakh Wien met with the Austrian club Rapid Wien, July 8, 2016, the first time Rapid won the Austrian Cup as the state champion of Wien and the 8th of July, 2016. In spite of the history, budget, or power ratio between the two clubs, Karabakh Wien suffered a surprisingly fierce battle with the local community in Vienna and lost 3-1 to Rapid Wien.

Regionalliga

2017–18 season

As master of the league of the viennese city, a rose in the regional league. Since September 2017, the football department has been transferred to FC Karabakh Wien GmbH. Since February 2018 leading the first team to play their home games at the Rudolf-Tonn-Stadion in Schwechat from.

Renamed to FC Mauerwerk
On 29 June 2018, it was announced that the previous Azerbaijani donors Orkhan Valiyev after the missed promotion to the new 2nd league and the club is taken over by the native Egyptian Mustafa Elnimr. Elnimr, who is already a sponsor of the Wiener Stadtliga club Mauerwerk Sport Admira, will not merge the two clubs but will continue Karabakh Wien as FC Mauerwerk. Masonry Sport will act as a satellite club of the FC Mauerwerk and introduce talents to the first team, because the club's goal is still the rise in the 2. Liga.

Players

Current squad

Out on loan

Coaching staff

Notable players

Players with 45 or more league appearances
Statistics correct as of the end of the 2014–15 season.

Appearance include league matches at amateur level in the Austrian football league system (Regionalliga East, Wiener Stadliga, 2. Landesliga Wien and Oberliga Wien).
Appearance include substitute appearance.
Players marked in bold are still playing in the professional team.

Captains
Only captains in competitive matches are included.
Players marked in bold are still playing in the professional team.

Coach history

Past seasons

Reserve team
History
Since the appearance of the first team in Regionalliga in 2017, the second men's team of the club participates in the regular operation of the game. She worked before in the reserve game operation of the city Wien. The second team initially played in Oberliga B Wien, which is the 3rd league of the Wien Football Association and the 6th league of Austrian Football Association.

The team's stadium is Sportplatz Kaiserebersdorf, where the first team played from 2015 until being promoted to Regionalliga, and much of the championship until moving in early 2018.

Current squad

Coaching staff

Past seasons

Youth academy
Football school consisted of 9 children, consisting of different age groups, U7, U9, U10, U11, U12, U13, U14, U16 and U18. In parallel, the fitness, mental and technical education base of the football school has been structured effectively and with the participation of experienced coaches to identify and develop children's full potential. The club's children-youth sports school consists of 200 younger and younger players from 20 different nationalities, a 25-man squadron and five additional technical staff. Mauerwerk football club has a favorable feature in Vienna football with a team of multicultural children-youth sports school.

Honours
League
Wiener Stadtliga: (IV)
Champions (1): 2016–17
2. Landesliga Wien: (V)
Champions (1): 2015–16
Oberliga Wien: (VI)
Runners-up (1): 2014–15
1. Klasse Wien: (VII)
Champions (1): 2017–18 ‡

‡ Reserve team

Cup
Wien Cup: 
Champions (1): 2015–16Semi-finalist (1):'' 2014–15

Youth league
U18 C-Liga
Champions (1): 2015–16
U16 C-Liga
Champions (1): 2016–17
U14 B-Liga
Champions (1): 2017–18

References

External links
 Official website 

 
Football clubs in Austria
Football clubs in Vienna
Association football clubs established in 2014
2014 establishments in Austria